Farsley is a town in the City of Leeds metropolitan borough, West Yorkshire, England  to the west of Leeds city centre,  east of Bradford. Farsley is situated between the two cities and near the town of Pudsey. Before April 1974, Farsley was part of the Borough of Pudsey. Before 1934 it was its own urban district council. It had its own council offices opposite the cenotaph, which is now a dental practice. The ward of Calverley and Farsley also includes the estate of Swinnow and some northern parts of Pudsey.

During the industrial revolution, Farsley was a centre for wool processing as there were a number of mills in the area. Sunny Bank Mills, still owned by the Gaunt family, is currently part of a huge multi-million revitalisation project bringing a new appreciation of Farsley's mill heritage.

Farsley is just off the main road between Leeds and Bradford and just off the A6110 Leeds outer ring road. New Pudsey railway station is between Farsley and Pudsey providing train services towards Leeds, Bradford, Manchester Victoria and Blackpool.

Etymology
The name Farsley is first attested in the 1086 Domesday Book as Fersellei and Ferselleia. The second element of the name comes from the Old English word lēah ('open land in a wood'). The etymology of the first element is less certain, but thought either to be Old English fyrs ('gorse') or the putative *fers ('heifer'). Thus the name originally meant either a clearing characterised by gorse bushes or by grazing cattle.

Education
In Farsley there are three primary schools: Farsley Farfield Primary School for 3 to 11-year-old children, Westroyd Primary School and Nursery for 3 to 11 year olds, and Farsley Springbank Primary School for 4 to 11 year old pupils. The local secondary school is Co-op Academy Priesthorpe with about 1,100 pupils.

Sport

Farsley is home to the non-League football team Farsley Celtic F.C. who play at The Citadel (previously known as Throstle Nest). They were formed to replace Farsley Celtic A.F.C. who played in the Football Conference for several years prior to their winding up in March 2010.

Farsley Cricket Club, whose ground is situated in Red Lane, play in the Bradford League Division 1. Raymond Illingworth, former England cricket captain, is their most notable former player.

Housing

Farsley has a variety of housing. Around Town Street are some older terrace houses and smaller cottages. To the west of Town Street is a small council estate, consisting mainly of flats, the tallest block being twelve stories high. Towards the outskirts of Farsley there are many large detached houses.

Notable people
 The Rev. Samuel Marsden (born in Farsley) was associated with the reformist William Wilberforce in England, was ordained in 1794, married Elisabeth Fristan, and then sailed to New South Wales, Australia. He arrived in Sydney on 10 March 1794, shortly after the birth of their first child, Anne. By 1795 he was settled in Parramatta, where he became Chaplain, wealthy landowner, farmer and magistrate.  He was known as the "Flogging Parson", because even by the standards of his day, he inflicted severe punishments while acting as a magistrate.  This has been attributed to a dislike of Roman Catholics and Irish. Joseph Holt, an Irish priest and activist, left on account of a flogging ordered by Marsden.  Sheephead Park is a memorial garden dedicated to Marsden and is situated on Farsley Town Street. The logo of Westroyd Primary School and Nursery, designed by a pupil, features a ram that was inspired by Sheephead Park.
 Sculptor John Wormald Appleyard (1831–1894) grew up in Farsley. There is a stained glass window dedicated to him, in St John's Church.
Rugby league footballer Fred Farrar, whose nickname was The Farsley Flyer, was a member of Hunslet's 1907–08 All Four Cups winning team.

Community engagement 
The Friends of Farsley Rehoboth Burial Ground charity was set up to purchase, reclaim and maintain a historic burial ground in Farsley, just off Coal Hill Lane. The group of volunteers won an Aviva Community Fund £1,000 grant and went on to receive registered charity status. The burial ground is situated in proximity to the Springfield Worsted Mill and the Bank Bottom Woollen Mill and had been closed to the public for over 11 years before the charity gained ownership in June 2019.

A 2019 Armistice Day Service in Farsley Rehoboth was broadcast on BBC Look North.

In November 2020 The Friends of Farsley Rehoboth reported they had been awarded a substantial grant of £14,200 from the Culture Recovery Fund for Heritage Programme.

The site's renovation has been achieved through collaboration with many local organisations including: Farsley Celtic FC, Farsley Parents and Toddlers Group, The Village Wine Bar, students from Co-op Academy Priesthorpe, the Gaunt family, Croft Street Fisheries, Co-op Community Fund, West Yorkshire Police cadets, local Councillor Andrew Carter CBE, Leeds City Council, and volunteers from The Church of Jesus Christ of Latter-day Saints.

See also
Listed buildings in Calverley and Farsley

References

External links
 YEP Farsley Today Community Website
 Street index
 Community Web site

Places in Leeds
Towns in West Yorkshire